GPCL T20- Global Power Cricket League is a T20 cricket tournament, which was held in India and the league was organized by Power Sportz. The goal of this league, which was in conjunction with India's Azadi Ka Amrit Mahotsav celebrations, was to gratify the dreams of young Indians living outside of India in countries like the United States, Canada, United Kingdom, Australia, and other nations to play in their motherland.

Football legend Ronaldinho had promoted the Global Power Cricket League (GPCL).

Teams 
Teams and scores are following.

League stage

1st match

2nd match

3rd match

4th match

5th match

6th match

7th match

8th match

9th match

10th match

11th match

12th match

References

Recurring sporting events established in 2022
Sports leagues established in 2022